Ethmia linsdalei is a moth in the family Depressariidae. It is found in Mexico.

References

Moths described in 1973
linsdalei